Jihad Benchlikha (born January 6, 1992) is a Moroccan professional basketball player. He currently plays for the FAR Rabat club of the Arab Club Basketball Championship and the Nationale 1, Morocco's first division.

He represented Morocco's national basketball team at the 2017 AfroBasket in Tunisia and Senegal.

References

External links
 FIBA profile
 Real GM profile
 Afrobasket.com profile

1992 births
Living people
Shooting guards
Moroccan men's basketball players
People from Kenitra